Shakeel Badayuni (3 August 1916 – 20 April 1970) was an Indian Urdu poet, lyricist and songwriter in Hindi / Urdu language films.

Early life
Shakeel Badayuni was born in Badaun, Uttar Pradesh. His father, Mohammed Jamaal Ahmed Sokhta Qadiri, wanted him to have a successful career, thus he arranged Arabic, Urdu, Persian, and Hindi tuition for Shakeel at home. His inclination towards poetry was not hereditary like other . One of his distant relatives, Zia-ul-Qadiri Badayuni, was a religious . Shakeel Masoodi was influenced by him and the contemporary environment of Badayun led him to poetry.

When he joined Aligarh Muslim University in 1936, he started participating in inter-college, inter-university mushairas and won frequently. In 1940, he married Salma, who was his distant relative and had been living in a common house with him since childhood, however, the purdah system was vogue in their family and they were not close. After completing his BA, he moved to Delhi as a supply officer, but continued participating in mushairas, earning fame nationwide. Those were the days of  who wrote about the downtrodden sections of society, their upliftment, the betterment of society and all. But Shakeel had an altogether different taste – his poetry was romantic and close to the heart. Shakeel used to say:

Main Shakeel Dil Ka Hoon Tarjuman
Keh Mohabbaton Ka Hoon Raazdaan
Mujhe Fakhr Hai Meri Shayari
Meri Zindagi Se Juda Nahin

During his Aligarh days, Badauni also started learning Urdu poetry formally from Hakim Abdul Waheed 'Ashk' Bijnori.

Career
Shakeel moved to Bombay in 1944, to write songs for films. He met film producer, A.R. Kardar and music composer, Naushad Ali, who asked him to sum up his poetic skills in one line. Shakeel wrote, Hum Dard Ka Afsana Duniya Ko Suna Denge, Har Dil Main Mohabbat Ki Ek Aag Laga Dengey. Naushad immediately retained him for Kardar's film, Dard (1947). The songs of Dard proved to be very successful, especially Uma Devi (Tun Tun)'s Afsana Likh Rahi Hoon. Only a few are so lucky that they attain success in their first film, but Shakeel deserved success which started with Dard and continued on over the years.

Together, he and Naushad became one of the most sought after composer/lyricist duos in the industry. Among the scores they churned out together, are those of "Deedar"  (1951), Baiju Bawra (1952), Mother India (1957), and Mughal-e-Azam (1960), that stand out. Other films they scored together include Dulari (1949), Shabab (1954), Ganga Jamuna (1961), and Mere Mehboob (1963). Although Shakeel Badayuni worked most extensively with Naushad, he also collaborated with Ravi and Hemant Kumar as well. His lyrics for the song Husnwale Tera Jawab Nahin and Ravi's music score both won Filmfare Awards for the hit film Gharana. His other notable film with Ravi is Chaudhvin Ka Chand (1960), while Sahib Bibi Aur Ghulam (1962) is his biggest hit with Hemant Kumar. The title song from Chaudhvin Ka Chand, rendered by Mohammed Rafi, won Badayuni the Filmfare Award for Best Lyricist in 1961.

Shakeel penned numbers for around 89 films. In addition, he wrote many popular ghazals sung by Begum Akhtar, and which are still sung by vocalists like Pankaj Udhas and others.

The Indian government had honoured him with the title Geet Kar-e-Azam.

Association with Naushad

Shakeel shared a close friendship with Naushad, Ravi and Naushad's former assistant, Ghulam Mohammed, with whom he enjoyed his life to the fullest. Naushad used Shakeel as the lyricist for his tunes for most of his films for a period of 24 years. Baiju Bawra, which was a milestone in both of their careers, was supposed to go to Kavi Pradeep. Vijay Bhatt, the director of the movie was insistent on using Kavi Pradeep as lyricist, since the film was supposed to have many devotional songs. Naushad requested Vijay Bhatt to hear the lyrics written by Shakeel. Vijay Bhatt agreed.

When Shakeel Badayuni was diagnosed with tuberculosis, he was put up in a sanatorium in Panchgani for treatment. Naushad knowing that his financial condition was not well, took 3 films to him, getting the lyrics written in the sanatorium, and got him a payment of nearly 10 times more than his normal fees.

Association with Ravi

Shakeel also wrote a substantial chunk of his songs for music director Ravi Sharma. Prominent amongst those were Chaudhvin Ka Chand (1960),  Gharana (1961), Ghunghat, Grahasti (1963), Nartaki (1963), as well as Phool Aur Patthar and Do Badan (both released in 1966).

Association with Hemant Kumar

Shakeel wrote for Hemant Kumar for movies like Bees Saal Baad (1962), Sahib Bibi Aur Ghulam (1962), Bin Badal Barsaat.

Association with S.D. Burman

Shakeel penned lyrics for the tunes of S.D. Burman for movies Kaise Kahoon & Benazir.

Others

C.Ramachandra – Zindagi Aur Maut, Wahan Ke Log.
Roshan – Bedaag, Noorjahan.

Personal life
Shakeel Badayuni succumbed to diabetes complications at the age of fifty-three, on 20 April 1970, at Bombay Hospital leaving behind his wife, two sons and two daughters. One daughter, Najma, died soon afterwards, while still a college student. His elder son Javed and grandson Zeeshan work in the travel and tourism industry. His other son's name is Tariq. Shakeel's friends Ahmed Zakaria and Rangoonwala formed a trust called Yaad-e-Shakeel after his death and this trust became the source of some income to his bereaved family.

Shakeel loved to play badminton, go on picnics and hunting trips and fly kites with his friends from the industry, Naushad and Mohammed Rafi. Sometimes Johnny Walker would join them in kite-flying competitions. Dilip Kumar, writers Wajahat Mirza, Khumar Barabankvi and Azm Bazidpuri were among Shakeel's other close friends within the industry.

His 20 best songs
Badayuni penned several memorable songs in his career. Some of his popular works include the musical Baiju Bawra (1952), historical epic Mughal-e-Azam (1960) and social Sahib Bibi Aur Ghulam (1962).
Suhani Raat Dhal Chuki (Dulari)
Man Tarpat Hari Darshan Ko Aaj (Baiju Bawra)
O Duniya Ke Rakhwale (Baiju Bawra)
Madhuban Me Radhika Naache Re (Kohinoor)
Pyar Kiya To Darna Kya? (Mughal- E- Azam)
Chaudvin Ka Chand Ho (Chaudvin Ka Chand)
Dil Laga Kar Hum Ye Samjhe (Zindagi Aur Maut)
Mere Mehboob Tujhe Meri (Mere Mehboob) (1963)
Jane Bahaar Husn Tera Bemisaal Hai (Pyar Kiya To Darna Kya)
Ek Shahenshah Ne Banwa Ke Haseen Taj Mahal (Leader)
Koi Saagar Dil Ko (Dil Diya Dard Liya)
Beqarar Kar Ke Hume (Bees Saal Baad)
Lo Aa Gai Unki Yaad (Do Badan)
Na Jao Saiyaan (Sahib Bibi Aur Ghulaam)
Meri Baat Rahi Mere Man Me (Sahi Bibi Aur Ghulam)
Aaj Puraani Raahon Se (Aadmi)
Jab Dil Se Dil Takrata Hai (Sunghursh)
Ek Baar Zara Phir Kahe Do (Bin Baadal Barsaat)
Tumhe Paa Ke Hum Ne (Gehra Daag)
Zindagi Tu Jhoom Le Zara (Kaise Kahoon)

Awards
 1961 Filmfare Best Lyricist Award for the song Chaudvin ka chand ho in the film Chaudhvin Ka Chand (1960)
 1962 Filmfare Best Lyricist Award for the song  husnwale tera jawab nahin in the film Gharana (1961)
 1963 Filmfare Best Lyricist Award for the song Kahin Deep Jale in the film Bees Saal Baad (1962)

Government recognition
A postage stamp, bearing his face, was released by India Post to honour him on 3 May 2013.

See also 
 Pyar Kiya To Darna Kya, a song by Shakeel Badayuni
 Insaaf Ki Dagar Pe, song by Shakkel Badayuni

References

Urdu-language poets from India
Indian lyricists
Filmfare Awards winners
1916 births
1970 deaths
Aligarh Muslim University alumni
People from Budaun
People from British India
20th-century Indian poets
Indian male poets
Poets from Uttar Pradesh
20th-century Indian male writers